Theodora was a Roman martyr. The little we know about her life is attributed to the Acta of Pope St. Alexander. She was the sister of St. Hermes, to whom she had given aid and care during his difficult time in prison. She was martyred some time after her brother, in 120. The siblings were later buried side by side on the Salarian road outside of Rome.

Notes

External links
Colonnade Statue in St Peter's Square

120 deaths
Saints from Roman Greece
2nd-century Christian martyrs
2nd-century Romans
Year of birth unknown
Ante-Nicene Christian female saints